Namnå is a village in Grue Municipality in Innlandet county, Norway. The Norwegian National Road 2 and the Solørbanen railway line both run through the village.

Since 2018, the population and area data for this village area has not been separately tracked by Statistics Norway.

References

Grue, Norway
Villages in Innlandet
Populated places on the Glomma River